The Hopkinson and Imperial Chemical Industries Professorship of Applied Thermodynamics at the University of Cambridge was established on 10 February 1950, largely from the endowment fund of the proposed Hopkinson Professorship in Thermodynamics and a gift from ICI Limited of £50,000, less tax, spread over the seven years from 1949 to 1955. The professorship is assigned primarily to the Faculty of Engineering.

The chair is named in honour of John Hopkinson, whose widow originally endowed a lectureship in thermodynamics in the hope that it would eventually be upgraded to a professorship.

List of Hopkinson and Imperial Chemical Industries Professors of Applied Thermodynamics

1951 - 1980 Sir William Rede Hawthorne
1980 - 1983 John Arthur Shercliff 
1985 - 1997 Kenneth Noel Corbett Bray
1998 - 2015 John Bernard Young 
2015–present Epaminondas Mastorakos

References

Engineering education in the United Kingdom
Imperial Chemical Industries
Applied Thermodynamics, Hopkinson and Imperial Chemical Industries
School of Technology, University of Cambridge
Applied Thermodynamics, Hopkinson and Imperial Chemical Industries
1950 establishments in the United Kingdom